Salvador Verges Soler (born 13 October 1958) is a Spanish rower. He competed in the men's coxed four event at the 1980 Summer Olympics.

References

1958 births
Living people
Spanish male rowers
Olympic rowers of Spain
Rowers at the 1980 Summer Olympics
Place of birth missing (living people)